When Black Birds Fly is a 2015 American adult animated horror film written, directed, animated, edited, and scored by James 'Jimmy ScreamerClauz' Creamer, the director of Where the Dead Go to Die, and was released by Bag Monster & MVD on January 15, 2016. The film had its official premiere on November 13, 2015 at Phil Anselmo's Housecore Horror Film Festival in San Antonio, Texas and was given an award for Best Animated Film

Plot summary

Heaven is a beautiful, clean suburban paradise. Every block is populated by lush trees and lovely row homes. People are free to roam and do whatever they please, as long as they follow one simple rule: DO NOT communicate with "The Evil One" that dwells on the other side of a giant wall that circles the town, which is under 24-hour surveillance by a team of soldiers wearing monstrous-looking gas masks. The ruler of the town is a man named Caine, who plasters images of himself all around town, insisting that his citizens trust and love him. A small child becomes obsessed with the seemingly increasing flocks of black birds that populate the town. One day after chasing one he discovers a talking cat with a broken leg, who begs Marius and his classmate Eden to crawl through a hole in the wall to help her. The kids decide to do it and she repays them by introducing them to a brightly-colored fruit that grows wildly on the other side of the wall. After consuming it the cat brings them to meet the Evil One, who attempts to teach them the forbidden knowledge that Caine is hiding from them all.

Cast
J.D. Brown	as Daryl
Brandon Slagle as Caine
Devanny Pinn as The Evil One
David Firth as Corvus
Victor Bonacore as Marius
Ruby Larocca as Dotty
Erin Russ as Eden
Erika Smith as Norma
Adam Brooks as Various Citizens
William Hellfire as Mr. Apple
Manoush as Kitty
M. dot Strange as The Messenger
Sean Murray as Reverend
Rodger Fischer as OSWA Soldiers
Rakel Musicbox as False Evil One
Tanner Summerset as Uncle T
Mad Dashiell as Various Citizens
Sarah Valentine as Lollipop
 nykTV as Various Citizens (credited as Nykolai Nightstar)

References

External links

2015 films
2015 3D films
2015 computer-animated films
2010s exploitation films
2015 horror films
2010s American animated films
American animated horror films
American avant-garde and experimental films
American independent films
American exploitation films
Films directed by Jimmy ScreamerClauz
American splatter films
2010s avant-garde and experimental films
2010s English-language films